Charles Davenport was an American eugenicist and biologist.

Charles Davenport may also refer to:

Charles Davenport (manufacturer) (1812–1903), manufacturer of passenger cars for railroads
Charles Edward Davenport, musician
Charles Davenport (American football) (born 1968), former professional American football player
Charlie Davenport, a character in Annie Get Your Gun